NYT is the New York Times, a newspaper.

NYT or nyt may also refer to:
 National Youth Theatre, a British charity
 Nay Pyi Taw International Airport's IATA code
 Yeti Airlines's ICAO code
 Nyawaygi language's ISO 639-3 code
 The New York Times Company's stock ticker symbol
 Nyt, a weekly supplement of Helsingin Sanomat

See also
 Nyt Tidsskrift, a former Norwegian magazine